Flora Recording & Playback is a recording studio located in Portland, Oregon operated by Grammy-nominated record producer Tucker Martine.

History

Flora Recording & Playback is the studio of Grammy Nominated producer/engineer/musician Tucker Martine. Housed in a former motorcycle club clubhouse, it's a 2500 square foot building in Northeast Portland, Oregon. The studio features a spacious live room, a meticulously designed control room, four isolation rooms of various sizes all with great sight lines to one another, a reverb chamber, floating floors, phenomenal acoustics, much natural light and an impressive gear list.

Outside producers that have chosen to work at Flora include T Bone Burnett, Danger Mouse and John McEntire.

Artists that have recorded at Flora include The Decemberists, R.E.M., My Morning Jacket, Modest Mouse, Broken Bells, Beth Orton, Neko Case, First Aid Kit, Mudhoney, Bill Frisell, Sufjan Stevens, Spoon, Grandaddy, Mavis Staples, Courtney Barnett, Iron And Wine, Gary Larson, The Jayhawks, Karl Blau, Edward Sharpe And The Magnetic Zeros, Blind Pilot, Camera Obscura, Robin Pecknold (Fleet Foxes), Stephen Malkmus (Pavement), k.d. lang, She and Him, M Ward, Mt.Joy, Case/lang/Veirs, Jesse Sykes, Karl Blau and Laura Veirs.

References

External links
 Official website

Recording studios in the United States
Economy of Portland, Oregon
2011 establishments in Oregon